Daniel Vargas may refer to:

 Daniel Vargas (runner) (born 1984), Mexican long-distance runner
 Daniel Vargas (volleyball) (born 1986), Mexican volleyball player